Cnemaspis lagang is a species of gecko endemic to Malaysia.

References

Cnemaspis
Fauna of Malaysia
Reptiles described in 2022